Verbena simplex, commonly known as narrowleaf vervain, is a perennial herbaceous plant plant in the Verbenaceae (vervain) family. It is native to central and eastern North America where it is found in open, dry, habitats on calcareous soil. It produces lavender flowers in the summer.

Description
Pairs of opposite, narrow leaves are spaced along the stems, which are glabrous or short-pubescent. The leaves are sessile or they may have a winged petiole. They are unlobed and finely toothed, narrowly lanceolate to oblanceolate or linear.

Distribution and habitat
V. simplex is native in the United States from Nebraska to the west, Texas and Florida to the south, Massachusetts to the east and the Canadian border to the north. In Canada, it is native in Ontario and Quebec. It is tolerant of disturbance, and is often seen in pastures and roadsides with sparse vegetation.

Conservation status
It is listed as endangered in Massachusetts and New Jersey, and as a species of special concern in Connecticut, Minnesota, and Wisconsin.

Ecology
The flowers bloom June through August and are attractive to bees, skippers and probably butterflies.

References

simplex
Flora of Eastern Canada
Flora of the Northeastern United States
Flora of the Southeastern United States
Flora of the North-Central United States
Flora of Texas